|}
{| class="collapsible collapsed" cellpadding="0" cellspacing="0" style="clear:right; float:right; text-align:center; font-weight:bold;" width="280px"
! colspan="3" style="border:1px solid black; background-color: #77DD77;" | Also Ran

The 2000 Epsom Derby was a horse race which took place at Epsom Downs on Saturday 10 June 2000. It was the 221st running of the Derby, and it was won by Sinndar. The winner was ridden by Johnny Murtagh and trained by John Oxx. The pre-race favourite Beat Hollow finished third.

Race details
 Sponsor: Vodafone
 Winner's prize money: £609,000
 Going: Good
 Number of runners: 15
 Winner's time: 2m 36.75s

Full result

* The distances between the horses are shown in lengths or shorter. hd = head; nk = neck.† Trainers are based in Great Britain unless indicated.

Winner's details
Further details of the winner, Sinndar:

 Foaled: 27 February 1997, in Ireland
 Sire: Grand Lodge; Dam: Sinntara (Lashkari)
 Owner: HH Aga Khan IV
 Breeder: HH Aga Khan IV
 Rating in 2000 International Classifications: 132

Form analysis

Two-year-old races
Notable runs by the future Derby participants as two-year-olds in 1999.

 Sinndar – 1st National Stakes
 Best of the Bests – 1st Solario Stakes, 2nd Royal Lodge Stakes
 Barathea Guest – 9th Coventry Stakes, 2nd Grand Critérium
 Zyz – 3rd Horris Hill Stakes
 Aristotle – 1st Racing Post Trophy
 Kingsclere – 4th Vintage Stakes, 3rd Solario Stakes, 2nd Stardom Stakes, 3rd Royal Lodge Stakes

The road to Epsom
Early-season appearances in 2000 and trial races prior to running in the Derby.

 Sinndar – 2nd Ballysax Stakes, 1st Derrinstown Stud Derby Trial
 Sakhee – 1st Sandown Classic Trial, 1st Dante Stakes
 Beat Hollow – 1st Newmarket Stakes
 Best of the Bests – 3rd Dante Stakes
 Hatha Anna – 5th Glasgow Stakes
 St Expedit – 2nd Predominate Stakes
 Barathea Guest – 1st Greenham Stakes, 3rd 2,000 Guineas, 4th Irish 2,000 Guineas
 Zyz – 3rd Easter Stakes, 3rd Dee Stakes
 Aristotle – 3rd Prix Greffulhe
 Inchlonaig – 4th UAE Derby
 Broche – 7th UAE Derby, 20th 2,000 Guineas, 5th Prix du Jockey Club
 Going Global – 3rd Sandown Classic Trial, 2nd Lingfield Derby Trial
 Kingsclere – 1st Easter Stakes, 5th Chester Vase

Subsequent Group 1 wins
Group 1 / Grade I victories after running in the Derby.

 Sinndar – Irish Derby (2000), Prix de l'Arc de Triomphe (2000)
 Sakhee – International Stakes (2001), Prix de l'Arc de Triomphe (2001)
 Beat Hollow – Grand Prix de Paris (2000), Woodford Reserve Turf Classic (2002), Manhattan Handicap (2002), Arlington Million (2002)
 Best of the Bests – Prix d'Ispahan (2002)

Subsequent breeding careers
Leading progeny of participants in the 2000 Epsom Derby.

Sires of Classic winners
<div style="font-size:85%">
Sinndar (1st)
 Shawanda - 1st Irish Oaks (2005) - Dam of Encke (1st St Leger Stakes 2012)
 Youmzain - 2nd Prix de l'Arc de Triomphe (2007, 2008, 2009)
 Rosanara - 1st Prix Marcel Boussac (2009)
 Diakali - 1st Champion Four Year Old Hurdle, 1st Prix Alain du Breil (2013)
Sakhee (2nd)
 Tin Horse - 1st Poule d'Essai des Poulains (2011)
 Sakhee's Secret - 1st July Cup (2007)
 Presvis - 1st Queen Elizabeth II Cup (2009)
 Grumeti - 1st Anniversary 4-Y-O Novices' Hurdle (2012), 1st Cesarewitch Handicap (2015)
</div>
Sires of Group/Grade One winners
Beat Hollow (3rd)
 Wicklow Brave - 1st Punchestown Champion Hurdle (2016), 1st Irish St. Leger (2016)
 Minella Indo - 1st Spa Novices' Hurdle (2019), 1st Cheltenham Gold Cup (2021)
 Cinders And Ashes - 1st Supreme Novices' Hurdle (2012)
 Sea Moon - 3rd St Leger Stakes (2011)

Other Stallions
Barathea Guest (8th) - Doubly Guest (3rd Warfield Mares' Hurdle 2009) - Exported to ItalyBest Of The Bests (4th) - Minor winners - Exported to CanadaWellbeing (5th) - Sired minor jumps winner before being gelded and sent over hurdles himselfAristotle (10th) - Exported to Australia before standing in Ireland where he sired a minor jumps winnerHatha Anna (6th) - Exported to Russia

References

External links
 Colour Chart – Derby 2000''

Epsom Derby
 2000
Epsom Derby
Epsom Derby
2000s in Surrey